Serial is a 1980 American comedy film produced by Paramount Pictures.  The screenplay, by Rich Eustis and Michael Elias, is drawn from the novel The Serial by Cyra McFadden, published in 1977. Produced by Sidney Beckerman and directed by Bill Persky, the film stars Martin Mull, Tuesday Weld, Sally Kellerman, Christopher Lee, Bill Macy, Peter Bonerz and Tom Smothers.  The original music score was composed by Lalo Schifrin.

Plot

In trendy Marin County, California, during the late 1970s, uptight Harvey Holroyd is quickly losing his patience.   He is also enduring something of a mid-life crisis.

On one hand, his wife Kate and her friends are thoroughly caught up in the sexual revolution and new age consciousness-raising and psychobabble. On the other hand, his rebellious teenage daughter Joanie is about to join a cult.   To make matters worse, it seems that Harvey and Kate's sexual relationship is seemingly over, as expressed in the film's first scene.

Harvey's best friend Sam, meanwhile, is having marital troubles, and Harvey is trying to land a higher-paying job with his corporate recruiter Luckman. In a parallel, Sam and Angela's sexual relationship is seemingly also over. Sam and Harvey chat about Harvey's mid-life crisis which Sam puts down to the lack of sex.

As marital problems persist, Kate and Harvey separate. The catalyst is a wild party thrown by Joannie while her parents are out at a friend's wedding. Each becomes sexually involved with someone else, albeit rather awkwardly. Harvey tries to avoid the advances of his newly hired secretary, Stella, who lures him to an orgy, but he does begin seeing Marlene, a free-spirited, 19-year-old, strictly vegetarian supermarket cashier. Kate links up with Paco, a bisexual Argentinian aspiring to be an artist, whose profession for now is to trim her dog's hair.

Being unhappy at home, Joanie is lured by "concerned" members of a flower-peddling cult. She goes voluntarily at first and finds peace and tranquility there, but eventually finds herself virtually imprisoned in their house in the big city.

Harvey and Kate manage to patch up their differences for Joanie's sake.  By means of a little blackmail that ensues from a surprise revelation involving Luckman, a gay motorcycle gang joins forces with Harvey to rescue Joanie.  Thus, the Holroyds are reunited and prepare for Harvey's new job in Denver.

Cast
Martin Mull as Harvey Holroyd
Tuesday Weld as Kate Holroyd
Jennifer McAllister as Joanie Holroyd
Sally Kellerman as Martha
Sam Chew Jr. as Bill, Martha's latest husband
Anthony Battaglia as Stokeley, Martha's son
Nita Talbot as Angela Stone
Bill Macy as Sam Stone
Pamela Bellwood as Carol
Barbara Rhoades as Vivian
Ann Weldon as Rachel, Martha's housekeeper
Peter Bonerz as Dr. Leonard Miller, a psychiatrist
Christopher Lee as Luckman ("Skull")
Patch Mackenzie as Stella
Stacey Nelkin as Marlene
Tom Smothers as Spike
Clark Brandon as Spenser
Paul Rossilli as Paco
Robin Sherwood as Woman Saltzburger

Critical reception

At the time, some film critics felt that the film was endorsing sexist and homophobic attitudes.  Vito Russo wrote that "the film is permeated with hatred for gays" and that it was "the perfect antifeminist, homophobic statement to usher in the age of Ronald Reagan."

Serial holds a 60% rating on Rotten Tomatoes based on five reviews.

References

External links

Josh Olson on Serial at Trailers from Hell

1980 comedy films
1980 LGBT-related films
1980 films
American LGBT-related films
Films based on American novels
Films scored by Lalo Schifrin
Paramount Pictures films
1980s English-language films
1980s American films
New Age in popular culture